The Alessandria Challenger is a professional tennis tournament played on outdoor red clay courts. It is currently part of the Association of Tennis Professionals (ATP) Challenger Tour. It is held annually at the Centro Sportivo Comunale "I. Barberis" in Alessandria, Italy, since 2008.

Past finals

Singles

Doubles

External links
Official website
ITF search

 
ATP Challenger Tour
Clay court tennis tournaments
Tennis tournaments in Italy